Gregory Sizer (13 August 1965 – 27 June 2021) was an Australian rules footballer who played with Melbourne in the Victorian Football League (VFL).

Notes

External links 
		
DemonWiki page

1965 births
2021 deaths
Australian rules footballers from Victoria (Australia)
Melbourne Football Club players
Geelong West Football Club players